Overcooked 2 (stylized as Overcooked! 2) is a cooperative cooking simulation video game developed by Team17 alongside Ghost Town Games, and published by Team17. The sequel to Overcooked!, it was released for Linux, macOS, Nintendo Switch, PlayStation 4, Windows, and Xbox One on August 7, 2018. The game was released for Amazon Luna on October 20, 2020. Overcooked: All You Can Eat, a compilation game that includes both Overcooked and Overcooked 2, was released for PlayStation 5 and Xbox Series X/S on November 12, 2020. The compilation came to Nintendo Switch, PlayStation 4, Windows, and Xbox One on March 23, 2021, and on Google Stadia on May 5, 2022.

Gameplay 

In the cooking simulator game Overcooked 2, teams of up to four players cooperatively prepare and cook orders in absurd restaurants. Players gather, chop, and cook ingredients, combine them on plates, serve dishes, and wash dishes. Between coordinating short orders and bumping into each other's characters, the game tends to overwhelm. The sequel builds atop the original game, which was released in 2016, with new interactive levels, restaurant themes, chef costumes, and recipes. Some levels have moving floors and other obstacles that complicate the cooking process, including portals, moving walkways, and impassable fires. Other levels transition between settings and recipes, such as one that begins with preparing salads in a hot air balloon and ends crashlanded in a sushi kitchen. The sequel introduces ingredient tossing, such that players can throw items to another chef or pot from far away, and online multiplayer, in which teams can connect either across a local wireless network or through online matchmaking.

Development 

Overcooked 2 was released on Nintendo Switch, PlayStation 4, Windows, and Xbox One platforms on August 7, 2018. It was developed by Team17 alongside Ghost Town Games, and published by Team17. It was announced a month prior, at E3 2018. Atop the base game, the developers created cosmetic add-on content, such as a platypus character costume exclusive to the Nintendo Switch release and a pack of other character costumes as pre-order bonus.

Reception 

Overcooked 2 received "generally positive" reviews, according to review aggregator Metacritic. Several reviewers noted that while it did not feel like a significant evolution of the formula established by Overcooked!, it was a strong sequel.

Jordan Devore of Destructoid called Overcooked 2 "one of the best co-op titles around" while praising the dynamic level design and frantic gameplay while taking minor issue with the basic recipes and a lack of snappy feel in the Nintendo Switch port. Johnny Chiodini of Eurogamer recommended the title, writing, "Overcooked 2 may be more of an improved recipe than a completely new menu, but it remains an excellent sequel and a delightful co-op experience", and praised the increased difficulty. In comparing the title with its predecessor, Andrew Reiner of Game Informer praised the title for its online play and for being less frustrating due to more forgiving scoring and level gating. Michael Leri of GameRevolution gave the game a 9 out of 10 and praised the game's ability to consistently remain fresh with teamwork-rewarding cooperative gameplay, dynamic level mechanics, and soundtrack. Kallie Plagge of GameSpot praised the throwing mechanic, writing, "The new throwing mechanic, too, adds a new dimension to both strategy and the inevitable chaos without overcomplicating things." Sam Loveridge of GamesRadar+ criticized the lack of visual clarity during chaotic bouts of gameplay and the sluggish controls while stating, "...when you're in the midst of a level, all of the frustrations melt away, because after all this is really an experience that you aim to have with friends." Mitch Vogel of Nintendo Life and Stephen Tailby of Push Square praised the improvements in presentation and performance the game made over its predecessor. Chris Schilling of PC Gamer criticized the chaotic interface and inconsistent level gimmicks while saying that the game felt more like an expansion than a sequel.

Accolades

References

External links 
 

2018 video games
Cooking video games
Nintendo Switch games
PlayStation 4 games
PlayStation 5 games
Windows games
Xbox Cloud Gaming games
Xbox One games
Xbox Series X and Series S games
Multiplayer and single-player video games
Multiplayer online games
Team17 games
Video games developed in the United Kingdom
Video game sequels
MacOS games
Indie video games
Linux games
Video games with downloadable content
The Game Awards winners
Time management video games